David Poljanec (born 27 November 1986) is a Slovenian football forward. He plays in Austria for WSC Hertha Wels in the Austrian Regionalliga Central.

He played for Bistrica, FC St. Nikolai im Sausal, SV Gleinstätten, FC Blau-Weiß Linz and SK Austria Klagenfurt in Austria, SC Paderborn 07 in the German 2. Bundesliga, and Israeli side Maccabi Ahi Nazareth in the Liga Leumit.  After playing with FK Radnički 1923 in the first half of the 2014–15 Serbian SuperLiga, during the winter break he returned to Austria and signed with Kapfenberger SV playing in the Austrian Football First League.

References

1986 births
Living people
Sportspeople from Maribor
Slovenian footballers
Association football forwards
Slovenian expatriate footballers
SC Paderborn 07 players
2. Bundesliga players
Maccabi Ahi Nazareth F.C. players
Liga Leumit players
FK Radnički 1923 players
NK Krško players
Karmiotissa FC players
Aris Limassol FC players
Serbian SuperLiga players
Slovenian PrvaLiga players
Cypriot First Division players
Kapfenberger SV players
Expatriate footballers in Germany
Expatriate footballers in Israel
Expatriate footballers in Serbia
Expatriate footballers in Austria
Expatriate footballers in Cyprus
Slovenian expatriate sportspeople in Germany
Slovenian expatriate sportspeople in Israel
Slovenian expatriate sportspeople in Serbia
Slovenian expatriate sportspeople in Austria
Slovenian expatriate sportspeople in Cyprus